Kus Ali (also Romanized as Kūs ‘Alī; also known as Kūseh ‘Alī) is a village in Nahr-e Mian Rural District, Zalian District, Shazand County, Markazi Province, Iran. At the 2006 census, its population was 233, in 62 families.

References 

Populated places in Shazand County